Lapuan Virkiä (abbreviated Virkiä) is a sports club from Lapua, Finland. The club was formed in 1907 and currently operates 11 divisions namely skiing, football, ice hockey, volleyball, wrestling, basketball, slalom, orienteering, swimming, fitness and athletics.  Another sport that the club excels at is pesäpallo. The men's football first team currently plays in the Kolmonen (Third Division). Their home ground is at the Lapuan keskuskenttä.

Background

Virkiä was established in 1907 and most of the time have played in the lower levels of Finnish football. Their key achievement has been one season in the Suomensarja (Finland League), the second tier of Finnish football in 1964.  They also have had five spells covering 14 seasons in the third tier, the Kakkonen (Second Division), in 1981–88, 1997, 2000, 2004–06 and 2009. In this respect the club have enjoyed their greatest success over the last decade as they have spent 5 seasons in the Kakkonen (Second Division).

Season to season

Club structure

Lapuan Virkiä run a large number of teams including 2 men's teams, 1 ladies team, 7 boys teams and 6 girls teams.

Footnotes

External links
Official Club Website
Football Club Website
Finnish Wikipedia
Suomen Cup

Football clubs in Finland
Lapua
Sports clubs established in 1907
1907 establishments in Finland